KRDO-TV (channel 13) is a television station in Colorado Springs, Colorado, United States, affiliated with ABC. It is owned by the News-Press & Gazette Company (NPG) alongside low-power Telemundo affiliate KTLO-LD (channel 46) and radio stations KRDO (1240 AM) and KRDO-FM (105.5). The four stations share studios on South 8th Street in Colorado Springs; KRDO-TV's transmitter is located on Cheyenne Mountain.

History
KRDO-TV first went on the air on September 21, 1953 as an NBC affiliate. At that time, KKTV (channel 11) was a primary CBS affiliate with a secondary affiliation with ABC, and KCSJ-TV (channel 5, now KOAA-TV) was the NBC affiliate for nearby Pueblo. As such, during much of the 1950s, Southern Colorado was served by two full-time NBC affiliates and a CBS affiliate that also carried ABC programming.

By 1960, the formerly separate Colorado Springs and Pueblo TV markets melded into one single market serving the Pikes Peak region and surrounding areas. At that point, each of the three commercial TV stations became "exclusive" network affiliates with KKTV retaining CBS, KCSJ-TV continuing with NBC and KRDO-TV becoming a full-time ABC affiliate. KRDO was one of the few ABC affiliates that didn't clear The Dick Cavett Show during the late 1960s and early 1970s.

KRDO-TV had been locally owned by Pikes Peak Broadcasting Company since the station signed on. In April 2006, the company announced that it was selling KRDO-TV (along with KRDO-AM and KJCT in Grand Junction) to the News-Press & Gazette Company. News-Press & Gazette officially took over operations of KRDO-TV on June 26, 2006; in honor of Pikes Peak Broadcasting, it changed the name of its Colorado broadcast group to Pikes Peak Television (NPG would divest KJCT in November 2013).

News operation
KRDO-TV currently broadcasts 36 hours of local news each week (with six hours each weekday and three hours each on Saturdays and Sundays). It was the first station in the Colorado Springs–Pueblo market to start up local newscasts in the morning, starting with weekdays in early 1983 (originally running 15 minutes in length and extending the length of the morning newscast over time) and adding weekend morning newscasts about 24 years later.

KRDO-TV's news operation was rebranded from News 13 to NewsChannel 13 on the same day that NPG took over the station's operations. Under NPG, KRDO expanded its newscasts starting with 5 p.m. and 6 p.m. newscasts replacing the single early evening 5:30 p.m. newscasts. It added weekend morning newscasts (currently airing from 6–7 a.m. and 8–9 a.m. both on Saturdays and Sundays) that started in the final week of December 2006. In June 2007 it started a midday newscast that airs from noon–1 p.m. Both were first anchored by former KKTV anchor Eric Singer who would anchor KRDO's 5 p.m. and 6 p.m. newscasts. Singer later worked at the Gazette as a reporter and anchor on the newspaper's new media platforms. As of 2018, Singer no longer works in media and/or any journalism field.

On July 23, 2008, KRDO-TV began broadcasting Southern Colorado's first local newscasts in high definition (HD), beginning with NewsChannel 13 at Noon.

On October 10, 2011, KRDO-TV added an early evening newscast at 4:30 p.m. The early evening newscast was moved up and extended to 4:00 p.m. during September 2012.

Former on-air staff
David Brody – news director (now serves as a correspondent for the CBN News segment on The 700 Club)
Giselle Fernández – Began her broadcasting career as the Pueblo reporter for KRDO-TV in 1983. She later worked for CBS and NBC among other prominent national broadcast positions.
John Gurtler – sports anchor (now serves as the play-by-play voice of the Buffalo Bandits)

Technical information

Subchannels
The station's digital signal is multiplexed:

Analog-to-digital conversion
KRDO-TV shut down its analog signal, over VHF channel 13, on June 12, 2009, the official date in which full-power television stations in the United States transitioned from analog to digital broadcasts under federal mandate. The station's digital signal remained on its pre-transition UHF channel 24. Through the use of PSIP, digital television receivers display the station's virtual channel as its former VHF analog channel 13.

Translators

References

External links

KTLO-LD website

RDO-TV
ABC network affiliates
Television channels and stations established in 1953
News-Press & Gazette Company
1953 establishments in Colorado
Telemundo network affiliates
Heroes & Icons affiliates
Dabl affiliates